Salvatore Cavallaro (born 16 August 1995) is an Italian boxer. He won three bronze medals at the European Amateur Boxing Championships in the middleweight events. Cavallaro also participated at the 2021 AIBA World Boxing Championships, being awarded the bronze medal in the middleweight event.

References

External links 

1995 births
Living people
Place of birth missing (living people)
Italian male boxers
Middleweight boxers
AIBA World Boxing Championships medalists
European Games silver medalists for Italy
European Games medalists in boxing
Boxers at the 2015 European Games
Boxers at the 2019 European Games
Mediterranean Games medalists in boxing
Mediterranean Games silver medalists for Italy
Mediterranean Games bronze medalists for Italy
Competitors at the 2018 Mediterranean Games
Competitors at the 2022 Mediterranean Games
21st-century Italian people